The following is a list of episodes for the anime series , which began airing in Japan on July 3, 2011. The second season of the anime series, finished airing in Japan on June 27, 2013. A third season aired from April 5, 2015, and under the name Uta no Prince sama: Maji Love Revolutions. On June 27, 2015, following the broadcast of the last episode of the third season, the ending message revealed that a fourth season has been confirmed. The fourth season, titled Uta no Prince-sama Maji LOVE Legend Star, aired on October 2, 2016.

Episode list

Season 1 (Maji Love 1000%)

Season 2 (Maji Love 2000%)

Season 3 (Maji Love Revolutions)

Season 4 (Maji LOVE Legend Star)

References

External links
 Uta no Prince-sama Official Anime Site
 

Uta no Prince-sama